Mariam, also known Mary, is a 2013 Syrian Arabic-language drama film directed by Basil Al-Khatib. The film tells the story of three women, all named "Maryam", living through in three different periods starting in 1918, passing through the June setback in Quneitra in 1967, and until 2012 and was filmed in several areas of Syria, including Baniyas, Mashta al-Helou, and Quneitra. Music is by Hazem Al-Anitar; the colorist is Osama Said. The movie chronicles a hundred years of Syrian history.

Mariam won prizes at festivals in Cairo, Oran, and Dakhla, Morocco. Khatib believes that it is this focus on the “human element” in Syria's conflict which has made the film a hit with festival audiences and juries.

Cast 
Ali Adel
Sabah Al Jazaery 
Doha Al-Dabes 
Lama Al-Hakim
Reem Ali 
Maisoun Abu Asaad 
Abed Fahed
Sollaf Fawakhirgi
Asad Fedda
Nadin Khoury
Roleen Al Qassim
Jihaad Saad
Sanaa Sawah

References

External links 
 
 

2013 films
2013 drama films
Syrian drama films
2010s Arabic-language films